Bhai Taru Singh (
– 1 July 1745) was a prominent Sikh martyr known for sacrificing his life, for protecting his Sikh values, by having had his head scalped rather than cutting his hair and converting to Islam.

Biography
Bhai Taru Singh was born around 1720 in Amritsar during the reign of the Mughal Empire. He was raised as a Sikh by his widowed mother and had one sister, Tar Kaur. Singh was engaged in agriculture at Poolha, Kasur, Lahore District, where he had a small farm and grew maize. 

Upon witnessing Sikh fighters save a poor girl from the clutches of the Mughal oppressors, Bhai Taru Singh decided to become initiated into the Khalsa. During this time, Sikh revolutionaries were plotting the overthrow of the Mughal governor of Punjab, Zakaria Khan. Singh and his sister gave food and other aid to the gursikhs (devout Sikhs of the Guru). An informant reported them to Zakaria Khan and the two were arrested for treason. Some sources, however, say that a mahant (akin to a 'great priest') was the one to have tipped off Mughal authorities because Bhai Taru Singh was harboring Sikh fighters. Though his sister's freedom was bribed for by the villagers, Singh refused to seek a pardon.

After a period of imprisonment and torture, Bhai Taru Singh was brought before the Khan and asked him where he got his powers from to undergo all of the agony. His reply was through his keshas ('unshorn hair') blessed by Guru Gobind Singh. Zakaria Khan ordered a barber to cut his hair to deprive him of his power and strength. When the barber attempted to do so, his hair became as strong as iron. Angered by this, the emperor ordered his scalp be cut off. According to prominent early Sikh historian Ratan Singh Bhangu, in response to having his scalp torn off, Taru Singh cursed Zakaria Khan, saying he would be killed by his shoes. According to Sikh sources, after cutting Singh's scalp, Zakaria Khan was stricken with unbearable pain and the inability to urinate. As a last resort, Khan sent an apology to the Khalsa Panth for his persecution of Sikhs and begged for forgiveness. It was suggested that if Khan hit himself with Singh's shoes, his condition might be lifted. Although it would cure Khan of his condition, he died 22 days later from having hit himself with the shoes, just as Singh predicted. Upon hearing that he had outlived the Khan, Bhai Taru Singh let go of his breath on his own will on 1 July 1745.

Legacy

In AD 1762, the Bhangi Sikh Sardar army conquered Lahore and took over the public square where Singh was scalped. The Abdullah Khan Mosque adjacent to the square was also occupied and converted into Shaheed Ganj Gurdwara. On the location today, Gurudwara Shaheed Bhai Taru Singh in Naulakha Bazaar, marks the place where Singh's scalp was removed.

Films on the story of Bhai Taru Singh 

 A print representing Singh's martyrdom is present in the 2007 film The Darjeeling Limited, in a scene set in a Sikh temple.
 A 3D-animated film about Bhai Taru Singh was released globally on 27 April 2018, directed by Vismaad Singh.

See also
 Gurudwara Shaheed Bhai Taru Singh
 List of Sikhs
 Chhota Ghallughara

References

External links
 Bhai Taru Singh - Animated Film

Sikh martyrs
Punjabi people
1720 births
1745 deaths
Executed Indian people
People executed for refusing to convert to Islam